Epsom Downs railway station is in the Borough of Reigate and Banstead in Surrey. The station, and all trains serving it, are operated by Southern. In the past the station had nine platforms, but today only one remains.

Epsom Downs is near  station which is on the Tattenham Corner line, also served by Southern. Both are in Travelcard Zone 6.

History 

With large numbers of passengers travelling to Epsom to visit the Epsom Downs Racecourse, it became clear that a station near the course was needed. Attempts to build one immediately next to it were strongly opposed by the Epsom Grandstand Association and eventually land was purchased half a mile from the course. Designed by David J. Field, the original station was opened on 22 May 1865 on the London, Brighton and South Coast Railway's extension from Sutton. The line had double track and a nine-platform station with a large building.

With the opening of Tattenham Corner railway station, much closer to the racecourse, on 4 June 1901 (Derby Day), traffic declined, helped in particular by the Royal Train changing its destination to Tattenham Corner in 1925. Services were cut back repeatedly over subsequent decades. On 1 May 1972 the number of working platforms was reduced to two, and following the destruction by fire of Epsom Downs signal box in November 1981 almost the entire branch was reduced to single track operation on 3 October 1982.

On 13 February 1989 a new station was opened  short of the original one. The old station and platforms were demolished and the land in between given over to a major housing development.  The replacement station was installed by British Rail under the Network SouthEast sector.

Services 
All services at Epsom Downs are operated by Southern using  EMUs.

The typical off-peak service in trains per hour is:
 2 tph to  via 

Prior to May 2018, the station was served by an hourly service on weekdays and Saturdays only, with no Sunday service. In May 2018, a half-hourly service was introduced on all days of the week.

References

External links 

Sutton & Mole Valley Line map
The Epsom Downs branch website

Transport in Epsom and Ewell
Railway stations in Surrey
Former London, Brighton and South Coast Railway stations
Railway stations in Great Britain opened in 1865
Railway stations in Great Britain closed in 1989
Railway stations opened by British Rail
Railway stations in Great Britain opened in 1989
Railway stations served by Govia Thameslink Railway
Epsom Downs Racecourse
1865 establishments in England
1989 establishments in England
Epsom